The National Audit Office (NAO) of Tanzania is an independent Parliamentary body in Tanzania which is responsible for auditing central government departments, government agencies and non-departmental public bodies. The NAO also carries out value for money (VFM) audits into the administration of public policy. The office is headed by the Chief Auditor General appointed by the President of Tanzania.

History 
Following the transfer of the mandate of Tanganyika Territory from Germany to Great Britain after the Treaty of Versailles, the Overseas Audit Services handled all the auditing responsibilities of the colonial government. On the 1st  July, 1961, the Exchequer and Audit Ordinance of 1961 came into effect in Tanganyika. This law changed the name of the Audit Department to the Exchequer and Audit Department and changed the name of the head of the Audit Department to become the Controller and Auditor General (CAG).

Following Independence the mandate of the CAG continued under the same ordinance and continued under the interim constitution in 1962 and the new constitution in 1977. With the increased privatization drive by the government, in 2001 the Exchequer and Audit Ordinance, 1961 was repealed and replaced by the Public Finance Act, No. 6 of 2001. The finance act was revised in 2008, and is the current mandate that provides the NAOT and the CAG its mandate, powers and independence.

List of Auditors Generals of Tanzania 
The following is a list of Auditor Generals of Tanzania since independence in 1961.

See also 

 National Board of Accountants and Auditors

References 

Politics of Tanzania
Government agencies of Tanzania
2001 in Tanzania
Government audit officials
Supreme audit institutions